Anetarca piutaensis is a species of sea slug, specifically an aeolid nudibranch. It is a marine gastropod mollusc in the family Facelinidae.

Distribution
This species was described from Punta Piuta, Limón Province, on the Caribbean Sea coast of Costa Rica.

References

Facelinidae
Gastropods described in 2003